Higgins Lake may refer to several lakes and at least one community.

Higgins Lake, Michigan, an unincorporated community
Higgins Lake, a lake in Roscommon County, Michigan
Higgins Lake (North Carolina), a lake in Guilford County, North Carolina 
Higgins Lake (Minnesota), a lake in Anoka County, Minnesota
Higgins Lake (California), a lake in Inyo County, California
Higgins Lake (Colorado), a lake in Adams County, Colorado 
Higgins Lake (Alabama), a lake in Randolph County, Alabama